Choptank may refer to a location in the eastern United States or a former Native American tribe:

Choptank people

Communities
Choptank, Maryland, Caroline County
Choptank Mills, Delaware, Kent County

Other
 Choptank (Middletown, Delaware), listed on the National Register of Historic Places listings in southern New Castle County, Delaware
Choptank Electric Cooperative, a not-for-profit energy organization
Choptank River, a tributary of Chesapeake Bay
Choptank River Fishing Pier, on the Choptank River
Choptank River Light, a lighthouse near Oxford, Maryland